Rowan Tyler Jones (born 21 May 1993), known by his stage name Route 94, is an English record producer and remixer from Richmond, London. Initially producing dubstep as Dream, Jones worked with the likes of Skream, Benga and Katy B. He then began producing house music. His single "My Love" was a commercial success, reaching number one in three charts.

Music career

2010–12: Dream and early career
In 2010, Jones began to produce dubstep as Dream. Three of his songs were uploaded by UKF Dubstep, and his songs were supported by several big names including Chase & Status and Skrillex who released the Dream EP This Isn't House on his label Owsla.

2012–present: Route 94 and commercial breakthrough
On 26 July 2012, Jones created social network accounts under the name Route 94 after getting his dubplates played on Skream and Benga's Radio 1 show. He explained that the moniker Route 94 came from the name of the road that runs from Chicago to Detroit, which is the birthplace of house and techno music. The Dream accounts were subsequently deleted at the time. He denied rumours of being Dream, using simply a logo and not revealing his name or face. This sparked interest from music blogs such as Fact, who made guesses as to his identity. It has since emerged that they are the same person; Jones has revealed the face of Route 94 and has been credited on albums. Throughout 2013 he produced remixes for Katy B, Skream, Storm Queen and an unreleased remix for Example as well as co-producing "Smile" from Benga's third studio album Chapter II.

The debut EP under the new alias, titled Fly 4 Life, was released on 17 June 2013 on his eponymous record label. He later signed to Rinse. In September 2013, BBC Radio 1 and BBC Radio 1Xtra began to play his debut single "My Love", featuring Jess Glynne. MistaJam added it to his Inbox:Fresh feature and it featured on Annie Mac's 2013 mix compilation. Its release date was announced as 2 March 2014, and it became added to Radio 1's A List for frequent airplay. Jones produced "Everything", a track from Katy B's second studio album, Little Red.

Glynne found her commercial breakthrough in 2014 with the Clean Bandit song "Rather Be", which topped the UK Singles Chart. This helped "My Love" gain exposure, and the song topped the UK Singles Chart, UK Dance Chart and Scottish Singles Chart upon entering the charts.

Following the success of "My Love", Jones released his second Route 94 EP Misunderstood on 23 July 2014.

Discography

Extended plays

Singles

As lead artist

Promotional singles

Other appearances

Remixes

Production credits

Notes

References

External links
Official website

English house musicians
English record producers
British electronic dance music musicians
Living people
Musicians from London
1993 births
Remixers
Owsla artists